Caiola is an Italian surname. Notable people with the surname include:

 Al Caiola (1920–2016), American guitarist, composer, and arranger
 Benny Caiola (1930–2010), Italian entrepreneur 

Italian-language surnames